Vigerslev Allé station is an S-train station in Copenhagen, Denmark. The station is located on Vigerslev Allé, the main traffic artery of its namesake neighbourghood of Vigerslev, which forms the westernmost part of the Copenhagen district of Valby.

It opened in 2005 and is served by the ring line.

References

Railway stations in Valby
S-train (Copenhagen) stations
Railway stations opened in 2005
Railway stations in Denmark opened in the 21st century